A. brassicae may refer to:

 Acholeplasma brassicae, a wall-less bacteria
 Aleyrodes brassicae, a whitefly with global distribution
 Alternaria brassicae, a plant pathogen
 Anthomyia brassicae, a pest of crops
 Aphis brassicae, a destructive aphid
 Ascobolus brassicae, an apothecial fungus
 Asteromella brassicae, a plant pathogen